Ilaya Thalaimurai is a 1977 Indian Tamil-language film, directed by Krishnan–Panju and written by Malliyam Rajagopal. The film stars Sivaji Ganesan and Vanisri. It was released on 8 May 1977.

Plot

Sampath is a poor graduate trying to find a job. Sakunthala is a rich young woman whose mother wants her to marry Kalai the chairman and also a friend of Sampath. Sakunthala and Sampath fall in love but face resistance from her mother and Kalai. Sampath heads to Madras to find work and becomes the warden of a college dorm. The terms of the job require him to remain unmarried and he isolates himself from Sakunthala. At the dorm, he is strict but acts as a positive guide to the students, helping them through various issues. His exacting expectations earn him a few enemies among the students, particularly Vasu. Sampath faces obstacles both in his mission to ensure the younger generation are heading in the right direction and in his goal of reuniting with Sakunthala.

Cast
Sivaji Ganesan as Sampath
Vanisri as Sakunthala
V. K. Ramasamy
K. D. Santhanam
M. N. Rajam as Kokila
S. N. Lakshmi
Srikanth as Vasu
Vijayakumar as Pandu
M. R. R. Vasu as Kalai
Nagesh as Sharma
Suruli Rajan
Y. G. Mahendran
Manorama as Ambujam Maami
K. Vijayan
Kathadi Ramamurthy
Junior Balaiah as Gopal
Veeraraghavan

Soundtrack 
The music was composed by  M. S. Viswanathan and all the songs were written by Kannadasan.

Reception 
Kanthan of Kalki criticised the story, said the film's only redeeming aspect was its cinematography.

References

External links
 

1970s Tamil-language films
1977 films
Films directed by Krishnan–Panju
Films scored by M. S. Viswanathan